Bedřich Bridel, or Fridrich Bridelius (1619, Vysoké Mýto – October 15, 1680, Kutná Hora) was a Czech baroque writer, poet, and missionary.

Biography 
He studied at the Jesuit gymnasium in Prague. In 1637 he entered the Jesuit order, he was ordained as a priest around 1650. From 1656 to 1660 he led the printing office of the Jesuits in the Prague Clementinum. Following the 1660 he devoted himself exclusively to the missionary and predicatory activities in Bohemia. He died of plague.

Work 
Bridel's literary output is varied, he used more forms and genres. The majority of his works are catechetic books. He also translated the German and Latin texts into Czech.

List of selected works 
 Co Bůh? Člověk? (What God? Man?) – a long meditative poem that is regarded today as one of the most important works of the Bohemian baroque poetry
 Život svatého Ivana, 1656 (The life of the saint Ivan)
 Stůl Páně (The table of the Lord)
 František svatý Xaver (Saint Francis of Xavier)
 Sláva Svatoprokopská, 1662 (The glory of the saint Prokop)
 Katechismus katolický (Catholic catechism)

See also

 List of Czech writers

References 

1619 births
1680 deaths
17th-century Bohemian people
17th-century Bohemian writers
17th-century Bohemian poets
Catholic poets
Czech Catholic poets
Czech-language writers
Czech male poets
People from Vysoké Mýto
People from Kutná Hora
17th-century deaths from plague (disease)
Czech Jesuits
Jesuit missionaries
Czech Roman Catholic missionaries
Roman Catholic missionaries in the Czech Republic
17th-century male writers
Baroque writers